Duddo Five Stones is a stone circle north of Duddo in North Northumberland, approximately 4miles (6 km) South of the Scottish Border. The stones were known as the Four Stones until 1903, when the fifth stone was re-erected to improve the skyline. There were originally seven stones, the empty sockets of two stones being found on the western side during excavation in the 1890s.

The stones are formed of a soft sandstone. They have become deeply fissured by natural weathering since erection in the Early Bronze Age, approximately 4000 years ago.

The site of the Duddo Stones offers panoramic views of the Cheviot Hills to the South and the Lammermuir Hills to the north.

The circle is accessible via the B6354 road, through a gate and up a path. The stones are on private land with no formal right of way, but the landowner has cleared a permissive path across the field to the stones. The location was the subject of an archeological investigation in 2008.

See also
The Goatstones
Stone circles in the British Isles and Brittany
List of stone circles

References

External links

Stone Age sites in England
Archaeological sites in Northumberland
Buildings and structures in Northumberland
Tourist attractions in Northumberland
Stone circles in England